Luca Inch is a New Zealand rugby union player who plays for  in the Bunnings NPC and the  in Super Rugby. His position is prop.

Career 
In May 2021 Inch was named in the 2021 New Zealand Under 20 squad. He was named in the Tasman Mako squad as a development player for the 2021 Bunnings NPC. Inch made his debut for Tasman in Round 3 of the competition against , coming off the bench in a 29-48 win for the Mako. The side went on to make the final before losing to  23–20. He was named in the  squad as a late signing for the 2022 Super Rugby Pacific season.

References

External links
itsrugby.co.uk profile

Living people
Highlanders (rugby union) players
New Zealand rugby union players
People educated at Nelson College
Rugby union players from Motueka
Rugby union props
Tasman rugby union players
2001 births